Hoodoo most commonly refers to:
 Hoodoo (spirituality), a traditional African American folk spirituality
 Hoodoo (geology), a rock formation

It may also refer to:

Places

Canada 
 Hoodoo Mountain, a stratovolcano in northwestern British Columbia
 Castle Rock Hoodoos Provincial Park, near Savona, British Columbia
 Dutch Creek Hoodoos, near Canal Flats, British Columbia
 Rural Municipality of Hoodoo No. 401, Saskatchewan, a rural municipality

United States 
 Hoodoo Mountains in Idaho
 Hoodoo Butte, a volcanic cone in Oregon
 Hoodoo (ski area), a ski resort in Oregon
 Hoodoo Peak, a mountain in Washington state
 Hoodoo Peak (Wyoming), a mountain in Yellowstone National Park

Music 
 Hoodoo Gurus, an Australian rock music group
 Hoodoo (Alison Moyet album), the third solo album by singer-songwriter Alison Moyet, or its title track
 Hoodoo (John Fogerty album), John Fogerty's third solo album, recorded in the late spring of 1976 but never released
 Hoodoo (Krokus album), the 16th album by heavy metal band Krokus
 "Hoodoo", a song by the English rock band Muse from their album Black Holes and Revelations

Other uses 
Hoodoo, a book by Ronald L. Smith
Hoodoo: Unraveling the 100 Year Mystery of the Chicago Cubs, a book by Grant DePorter
 Horatio J. HooDoo, a character in the Lidsville TV series
Hoodoo McFiggin, a character in the short story "Hoodoo McFiggin's Christmas" by Stephen Leacock

See also
 The Hoodoo War (1875–1876)
 USS Texas (1892), a battleship of the United States Navy nicknamed "Old Hoodoo"
 Voodoo (disambiguation)